Barnette is a surname. Notable people with the surname include:

Elbridge Truman Barnette, (1863–1933) American adventurer
Lauren Barnette, American pageant contestant
Michael C. Barnette, American sea diver
Neema Barnette, American director
Tony Barnette, American baseball player

See also
Barnette's conjecture, unsolved math problem
West Virginia State Board of Education v. Barnette, a Supreme Court case about religious liberty